Matthew Ashby was born in York County, Virginia, in 1727. He is a notable and rare example of the successful escape from slavery and indentured servitude. The son of a black slave and a white indentured servant, he was born free under Virginia law, which at the time gave children the legal status of their mothers. Ashby worked around the Williamsburg area as a carter and carpenter. He was also known to deliver messages for the state, working for Governor Botetourt. Although he himself was indentured until the age of 31, by law, he managed to acquire many things that were well out of the realm of the average slave or servant, including a silver watch, candle making supplies, tea boards, and books.  

Matthew married Ann, a slave of the bricklayer, Samuel Spurr. They had two children named John and Mary, who attended the Bray school affiliated with the College of William and Mary.   Ms. Anne Wager taught the children the Church of England catechism as well as other subjects. Matthew was able to use his free status to buy his children and wife from Spurr, at the cost of £150.  

Despite owning his own children and wife Ashby still had to petition the government for their freedom. Standing before the council, Ashby proclaimed that his wife had been faithful and diligent in all her wifely duties, and that his children were also deserving of their freedom. The council deliberated and found that they agreed with his proposal and his family was granted their freedom in 1769. Two years later Ashby died of a heart disease, leaving his family alone; however, he had successfully freed them from slavery and amassed a sizable estate with monetary value well above the average indentured servant or slave.

References

Alkalimat, Abdul (2004). The African American Experience in Cyberspace. Pluto Press. .
Matthew Ashby biography
Representation at Colonial Williamsburg

1727 births
1771 deaths
American indentured servants
People from York County, Virginia
18th-century American slaves